Potamolithus iheringi is a species of gastropod belonging to the family Tateidae.

The species is found in South America.

References

Tateidae